The 2019 Meridian Canadian Open was held from January 8 to 13 at the Civic Centre in North Battleford, Saskatchewan. This will be the fifth Grand Slam event and third "major" of the 2018–19 curling season.

On the men’s side, Brendan Bottcher of Edmonton defeated John Epping of Toronto 6-3 in seven ends to win his first Grand Slam. On the women’s side, Rachel Homan of Ottawa edged Silvana Tirinzoni of Aarau 4-3 to win her tenth slam. With the win, Homan passed Jennifer Jones for most career Grand Slam wins, excluding defunct slams. It was also Homan's third straight slam win of the season.

Qualification

Sixteen teams compete in the Canadian Open, including the seven top-ranked teams on the World Curling Tour's Order of Merit rankings as of December 3, 2018, the seven top teams on the Year-to-Date rankings as of December 3, the Tier 2 winner of the 2018 Tour Challenge, and a sponsor's exemption.

Men
Top men's teams as of December 3:

Sponsor's exemption:
 Rylan Kleiter

Tour Challenge Tier 2 winner:
 Kirk Muyres

Women
Top women's teams as of December 3:

Sponsor's exemption:
 Robyn Silvernagle

Tour Challenge Tier 2 winner:
 Elena Stern

Men

Teams

Knockout brackets

A Event

B Event

C Event

Knockout results

Draw 1
Tuesday, January 8, 7:00 pm

Draw 2
Wednesday, January 9, 8:00 am

Draw 3
Wednesday, January 9, 11:30 am

Draw 4
Wednesday, January 9, 3:00 pm

Draw 5
Wednesday, January 9, 7:00 pm

Draw 7
Thursday, January 10, 11:30 am

Draw 9
Thursday, January 10, 7:00 pm

Draw 10
Friday, January 11, 8:00 am

Draw 11
Friday, January 11, 11:30 am

Draw 12
Friday, January 11, 3:00 pm

Draw 13
Friday, January 11, 6:30 pm

Draw 14
Saturday, January 12, 8:00 am

Playoffs

Quarterfinals

Saturday, January 12, 3:00 pm

Semifinals

Saturday, January 12, 7:00 pm

Final

Sunday, January 13, 11:30 am

Women

Teams

Knockout brackets

A Event

B Event

C Event

Knockout results

Draw 2
Wednesday, January 9, 8:00 am

Draw 3
Wednesday, January 9, 11:30 am

Draw 4
Wednesday, January 9, 3:00 pm

Draw 5
Wednesday, January 9, 7:00 pm

Draw 6
Thursday, January 10, 8:00 am

Draw 7
Thursday, January 10, 11:30 am

Draw 8
Thursday, January 10, 3:00 pm

Draw 9
Thursday, January 10, 7:00 pm

Draw 10
Friday, January 11, 8:00 am

Draw 11
Friday, January 11, 11:30 am

Draw 12
Friday, January 11, 3:00 pm

Draw 13
Friday, January 11, 6:30 pm

Playoffs

Quarterfinals

Saturday, January 12, 11:30 am

Semifinals

Saturday, January 12, 7:00 pm

Final

Sunday, January 13, 3:00pm

References

External links

 

Canadian Open of Curling
Canadian Open
2019 in Canadian curling
North Battleford
Curling in Saskatchewan
2019 in Saskatchewan